The men's 1500 metres race of the 2013 World Single Distance Speed Skating Championships was held on 21 March at 16:35 local time.

Results

References

Men 01500